Alejandro Freire (born August 23, 1974) is a former first baseman in Major League Baseball who played briefly for the Baltimore Orioles during the  season. Listed at 6' 2", 220 lb., Freire batted and threw right-handed.

Biography
Born in Caracas, Venezuela, Freire debuted as a rookie in 1994, with the GCL Astros, a minor league affiliate team of the Houston Astros. He spent nearly twelve full seasons in the minors, playing also for the Detroit, St. Louis, San Francisco and Baltimore systems before reaching the majors. In between, Freire played winter ball for the Águilas del Zulia, Caribes de Oriente, Navegantes del Magallanes and Tiburones de La Guaira clubs of the Venezuelan Professional Baseball League  from 1995 through 2006.

Freire debuted with the Orioles in the middle of the 2005 season. He gained the promotion after hitting 299 with 19 home runs and 69 RBI in 106 games for Triple-A Ottawa Lynx. In 25 games for Baltimore he hit .246 (16-for-65) with one home run and four RBI, appearing as a backup for Rafael Palmeiro (in 16 games) or as designated hitter (9).

Freire divided his playing time between Ottawa and with the independent Camden Riversharks in 2006, his last professional season. He hit a combined .289 average with 184 home runs and 741 RBI in 1323 games for 12 different minor league teams between 1994, and 2006. 

Following his playing retirement, Freire has worked as a color commentator for ESPN Deportes during winter baseball.

See also
2005 Baltimore Orioles season
Cup of coffee
Players from Venezuela in MLB

External links

Retrosheet

1974 births
Living people
Águilas del Zulia players
Baltimore Orioles players
Baseball announcers
Bowie Baysox players
Caffe Danesi Nettuno players
Camden Riversharks players
Caribes de Oriente players
Erie SeaWolves players
Fresno Grizzlies players
Gulf Coast Astros players
Jacksonville Suns players
Kissimmee Cobras players
Lakeland Tigers players
Major League Baseball first basemen
Major League Baseball players from Venezuela
Navegantes del Magallanes players
Norwich Navigators players
Ottawa Lynx players
Quad Cities River Bandits players
Rojos del Águila de Veracruz players
Shreveport Swamp Dragons players
Baseball players from Caracas
Tiburones de La Guaira players
Venezuelan expatriate baseball players in Canada
Venezuelan expatriate baseball players in Italy
Venezuelan expatriate baseball players in Mexico
Venezuelan expatriate baseball players in the United States
Minor League Baseball broadcasters